William the Younger may refer to:

William Peverel the Younger (c. 1080–1155), son of William Peverel
William of Jülich (died 1304), known as the Younger
William IV, Duke of Brunswick-Lüneburg (c. 1425–1503), called William the Younger
William the Younger, Duke of Brunswick-Lüneburg (1535–1592)
William Alexander (the younger) (c. 1602–1638), founder of the Scottish colony at Port-Royal
William Cawley (younger) (born c. 1628), English lawyer and politician
William Faithorne the Younger (1656–1701?), English mezzotint engraver
William Morgan (of Tredegar, younger) (1725–1763), Welsh politician
William Pitt the Younger (1759–1806), British statesman
William Heberden the Younger (1767–1845), British physician
William Godwin the Younger  (1803–1832), English reporter and author
William Holl the Younger (1807–1871), English portrait and figure engraver
William Urwick the younger (1826–1905), Anglo-Irish nonconformist minister and antiquarian chronicler